The Antsi (Anchi) language or Mag-antsi (also Mag-Anchi Ayta) is a Sambalic language with around 4,200 speakers. It is spoken within Philippine Aeta communities in the Zambal municipalities of Botolan, San Marcelino, and Castillejos; in the Tarlaqueño municipalities of Capas and Bamban; in Mabalacat, Pampanga; and in Angeles City. The use of the language is declining as its speakers are shifting to Kapampangan. The language is mutually intelligible with Mag-Indi Ayta (77%) and Ambala Ayta (65%).

Phonology

See also
Languages of the Philippines

References

Further reading

External links
 Online Ayta Mag-antsi-English dictionary hosted by SIL
 Sample recordings from the GRN Network

Sambalic languages
Endangered Austronesian languages
Aeta languages
Languages of Zambales
Languages of Tarlac
Languages of Pampanga